Acanthodoris pina is a species of sea slug, a dorid nudibranch, a shell-less marine gastropod mollusc in the family Onchidorididae.

Distribution 
This species was described from Puerto Penasco, Sonora, Mexico. It has been reported from there south to Bahía de los Ángeles. It is thought to be endemic to the northern part of the Gulf of California. Specimens from Baja California have been sequenced for the 16S ribosomal RNA, Histone H3 and CO1 genes.

References

Onchidorididae
Gastropods described in 1967